The 1944 Manchester Rusholme by-election was held on 8 July 1944.  The byelection was held due to the death of the incumbent Conservative MP, Edmund Radford.  It was won by the Conservative candidate Frederick Cundiff.

References

1944 in England
1944 elections in the United Kingdom
Rusholme
1940s in Manchester
July 1944 events